Kylix zacae is a species of sea snail, a marine gastropod mollusk in the family Drilliidae.

Description
The shell grows to a length of 15 mm.

Distribution
This species occurs in the demersal zone of the Pacific Ocean off Santa Inez Bay, Gulf of California, Western Mexico

References

  Tucker, J.K. 2004 Catalog of recent and fossil turrids (Mollusca: Gastropoda). Zootaxa 682:1–1295

External links
 

zacae
Gastropods described in 1951